Royal Air Force Hornchurch or RAF Hornchurch is a former Royal Air Force sector station in the parish of Hornchurch, Essex (now the London Borough of Havering in Greater London), located to the southeast of Romford. The airfield was known as Sutton's Farm during the First World War, when it occupied  of the farm of the same name.

Although the airfield closed shortly after the end of the war, the land was requisitioned in 1923 because of the expansion of the Royal Air Force and it re-opened as a much larger fighter station in 1928. The airfield was ideally to cover both London and the Thames corridor from German air attacks. It was a key air force installation between both wars and into the jet age, closing in 1962.

History

In 1915 the London Air Defence Area (LADA) was established and airfields were built around London to defend the capital from the growing threat from German airships. Sutton's Farm, along with its neighbour Hainault Farm (just east of what became the Second World War airfield of Fairlop),  to the north-east, were selected due to their location covering the eastern approaches to London. They were named Landing Grounds Nos. II and III respectively and joined the existing airfields of North Weald, Rochford and Joyce Green. Suttons Farm airfield became operational on 3 October 1915, initially with two BE2c aircraft.

As the number of aircraft increased at the airfields around London, it was decided to organise them into 39 (Home Defence) Squadron, which was formed in April 1916, under the command of Major (later Brigadier-General) Thomas Higgins. As the enemy threat moved from airships to aircraft, better aircraft were introduced to counter them. The BE12, Sopwith 1½ Strutter, Sopwith Pup, FE2, Bristol Fighter, SE5a and Sopwith Camel all operated from Sutton's Farm at some stage, some with more success than others. 39 Squadron moved to North Weald in September 1917 and was replaced by 78 Squadron, under the command of Major Cuthbert Rowden, a 20-year-old veteran of the air war in France and subsequent winner of the Military Cross. 78 Squadron was later joined by 189 Night Fighter Training Squadron with Sopwith Pups and Camels.

The first recorded interception of an enemy airship over Britain was made by Lt. (later Marshal of the Royal Air Force) John Slessor on the very day he arrived at Sutton's Farm, 13 October 1915. The attack had to be aborted as the airship disappeared into cloud and he had to break off the engagement. The first victory in Britain was not recorded until nearly a year later, on 2 September 1916 and was attributed to a pilot from Sutton's Farm, Lt. William Leefe Robinson. Robinson shot down a Schütte-Lanz SL11, one of a 16-strong raiding force over London, using new Brock and Pomeroy mixed incendiary ammunition, which had been adapted for this task. For this action Leefe Robinson was awarded the Victoria Cross and became a National hero. Two other Sutton's Farm pilots from the First World War, Lt. Frederick Sowrey and Lt. Wulstan Tempest, were awarded the DSO for their roles in the destruction of Zeppelins. Tempest's actions were particularly notable; even though his fuel pump was broken and he was having to pump fuel manually whilst flying the aircraft with his other hand, he still managed to engage and destroy an enemy airship and then find his way home in thick fog. These pilots, together with many others, are commemorated by street names in South Hornchurch.

Inter-war years

Soon after the war ended it was decided that Suttons Farm was surplus to requirements and the airfield was decommissioned, although it was retained on "List C" (stations temporarily retained for Service purposes) until 27 February 1920. The land was returned, most of the buildings demolished and farming resumed once more.

Following the decision in the early 1920s to expand the Royal Air Force, former First World War airfields were inspected to ascertain their suitability for use. Although small, Suttons Farm was ideally located to be able to defend the north-eastern approaches to London. After protracted negotiations, the original land was re-purchased, together with some further land to the south of the original airfield.

The new airfield took four years to build and opened, as RAF Sutton's Farm, in April 1928. Two months later the name was changed to RAF Hornchurch and the first unit to take up residency was No. 111 Squadron, led by Squadron Leader Keith Park, who also became the first station commander.

Second World War

During the Second world War the station was a Sector Airfield of RAF Fighter Command's 11 Group, covering London and the south east of England during the Battle of Britain in 1940. By this time, its command centre was in Romford, and a satellite station (an advanced attack outpost; RAF Rochford) was unpopular with the Hornchurch crews sent there from time to time because of the canvas accommodation. Richard Hillary, author of "The Last Enemy," was shot down after taking off from here on 3 September 1940. Following the war, Hornchurch was home to Flying Training Command's Aircrew Selection Centre for 10 years before it moved to RAF Biggin Hill.

A balloon unit was retained until closure for parachute training of military personnel, when on the 14 May 1961, CSM Albert E. Small of 10 Para Regt (TA) was a balloon cage Despatcher won the George Medal for gallantry due to a deflating balloon at 800ft.

The RAF station at Hornchurch closed in July 1962.

Today

Following a period of gravel extraction and infilling with rubbish in the 1970s, the airfield was extensively landscaped to create Hornchurch Country Park, with work commencing in 1980. Most of the former administrative and technical areas, including the two Type-A and one Type-C hangars, were levelled in the 1960s and the area is now a housing estate. The names of the streets of the estate commemorate the airfield and its pilots (such as Bouchier Walk, Kirton Close, Tempest Way, Robinson Close, Tuck Road, Bader Way and Malan Square). The former Officers' Mess is now a medical centre in Astra Close. The Officers' Mess (Astra House), Officers' Quarters (Astra Court East, West & North) and WO Quarters (89–99 (odd numbers) Wood Lane) are included in the RAF Hornchurch Conservation Area.

A local school, The R. J. Mitchell School, was named after the man who designed the Spitfire, and a large monument to this effect, with wreaths placed on Remembrance Day, is within the school railings. Another local school (Suttons School) was renamed Sanders Draper School in 1973, after an American pilot, Flying Officer Raimund (Smudge) Sanders Draper, flying with the Royal Air Force at the time, had an engine failure on take-off and stayed at his controls to ensure his aircraft didn't crash on the building, which was full of children at the time.

A number of pillboxes, command bunkers and gun positions, together with the largest number of surviving Tett Turrets in England, still exist within the boundaries of the former airfield and can be seen on the Eastern edge of the country park. RAF Hornchurch artefacts and memorabilia are housed in the Purfleet Heritage & Military Centre.

RAF Hornchurch was the subject of one of the programmes in the BBC TV series Two Men in a Trench.  In the programme, several of the defences were examined.  One of the Tett Turrets was excavated, the backfill of which contained a pair of 1940 RAF pilot's goggles along with material from the hospital.  The fire trench, a partially buried pillbox and an E pen were excavated, while the gun emplacement on the northern end of the site was cleared of vegetation.

The Good Intent pub, formerly with a large concrete, planetarium-like dome next door (used for training airgunners), still exists on the Southend Road, was popular with the aircrews, and has an interesting collection of photos of the Station.

A DVD about RAF Hornchurch was produced by Mike Jones for Streets Ahead Productions.

Finally after a great many years of hard work by the dedicated members of "Hornchurch Aerodrome Historical Trust" there is to be an "RAF Hornchurch Heritage Centre" opening in "Suttons House" on Suttons Lane. This was on the grounds of the former "Suttons Institution", later St Georges Hospital, which was commandeered by the Air Ministry for use by RAF personnel during the Second World War.

Controversy

William Leefe Robinson

Although Robinson was awarded the Victoria Cross for shooting down Schütte-Lanz SL11 in 1916, it wasn't celebrated in all quarters, particularly by serving pilots in France. Home Defence was viewed as a relatively easy role and Robinson had trouble earning the respect of his fellow pilots when he was subsequently posted to France. These views were compounded when Robinson was shot down by aircraft led by Manfred von Richthofen shortly after arriving in France. The awarding of the VC was, undoubtedly, partly politically motivated, although it must be remembered that any form of flying was inherently dangerous in 1916, particularly at night and at these tremendous heights without oxygen. Robinson also managed to single-handedly lift the spirit of a nation that had suffered the new terror of aerial bombardment from the apparently invincible airships.

Use of incendiary ammunition

Although effective in destroying enemy airships, the use of incendiary ammunition was banned under the terms of the Hague Convention of 1899 and pilots using it had to have signed orders from their commanding officer. This type of ammunition was issued only to squadrons in Home Defence roles and never to squadrons serving overseas. On his return to Sutton's Farm, William Leefe Robinson's CO ordered him to keep quiet about it as it was thought the propaganda value for the enemy would be invaluable should it leak out, even though the Germans had already broken the terms of the convention by using gas in 1915. Later in the war the use of incendiary ammunition became officially recognised.

The Battle of Barking Creek

The first aircraft to be shot down by the British in the Second World War, the circumstances surrounding which later came to be known as 'friendly fire' incidents, were two Hawker Hurricanes of 56 Squadron. On 6 September 1939, three days after the declaration of war, a searchlight battery on Mersea Island incorrectly identified a friendly aircraft crossing the Essex coast. A message was relayed to HQ 11 Group, which ordered Hurricanes from North Weald to investigate. They were subsequently misidentified as hostile aircraft themselves by the Chain Home Radar at Canewdon. Further aircraft from North Weald were scrambled to intercept their comrades, but they too were misidentified through a combination of miscommunication, inexperience and over-enthusiasm. A tragic, but inevitable mistake was now just minutes away; Spitfires from 74 Squadron, led by "Sailor" Malan, took off from Hornchurch and quickly engaged two Hurricanes, shooting them both down.

Pilot Officer Montague Hulton-Harrop was killed whilst the other pilot, Pilot Officer Tommy Rose, bailed out and landed safely.  The two pilots responsible for the attack, Pilot Officer John Freeborn and Flying Officer Paddy Byrne were placed under arrest upon their return to Hornchurch. Freeborn had been the squadron adjutant and had distributed orders that single engined aircraft should not be engaged as it was assumed that enemy fighters would not have the fuel to be able to fly a return sortie from Germany and, therefore, any single engined aircraft would be friendly.

A court-martial was held on 7 October 1939, at which, Freeborn later claimed, that Malan said he never gave the order to attack. All three were acquitted, with the judge claiming that the case should never have been brought to trial. The proceedings have never been made public.

Station commanders

Squadrons

During its relatively short life, RAF Hornchurch became home to many RAF squadrons:

The following squadrons were also here at some point:

Additional units:

See also
 Battle of Britain
 List of Battle of Britain airfields
 List of Battle of Britain squadrons
 List of former Royal Air Force stations

References

Notes
 a  Dates refer to the period Hornchurch was the squadron's base station and does not include rest periods and short postings to other airfields

Citations

Bibliography

 Barker, Ralph. A Brief History of the Royal Flying Corps in World War I. Robinson Publishing, 2002. .
 Bishop, Patrick. Fighter Boys. Harper, 2003. .
 Bowyer, Michael J.F. and Rawlings, John D.R. Squadron Codes 1937–56. Cambridge, UK: Patrick Stephens Ltd., 1979. .
 Cole, Christopher and Cheeseman, E.F. The Air Defence of Britain, 1914–1918. Hungry Minds Inc, 1984. .
 Cooksley, Peter G. Aviation Enthusiasts' Guide To London & The South-East, Cambridge, UK: Patrick Stephens Ltd., 1982. .
 Deere, Alan C. Nine Lives. Goodall, 1999. .
 Delve, Ken. The Source Book of the RAF. Shrewsbury, UK: Airlife, 1994. .

 Flintham, Vic and Thomas, Andrew. Combat Codes: A full explanation and listing of British, Commonwealth and Allied air force unit codes since 1938. Shrewsbury, UK: Airlife, 2003. .
 Glancey, Jonathan. Spitfire, The Biography. London: Atlantic Books, 2006. .
 Halley, James J. The Squadrons of the Royal Air Force & Commonwealth, 1918–1988. Tonbridge, Kent, UK: Air-Britain (Historians) Ltd., 1988. .
 Hurt, Zdenek. Czechs in the RAF in Focus. Red Kite, 2004. .
 Jefford, C.G. RAF Squadrons: A comprehensive record of the movement and equipment of all RAF squadrons and their antecedents since 1912. Shrewsbury, UK: Airlife, 1988, 2nd edition 2001. .
 Levine, Joshua. On a Wing and a Prayer: The Untold Story of the Pioneering Aviation Heroes of World War I. Collins, 2008. .
 Quill, Jeffrey. "Spitfire: a Test Pilot's Story". Air Data Publications, 1996. . (Republished by Crécy Publishing, 1998.  and reprinted 2001, 2005, 2008).
 Rawlings, John D.R. Fighter Squadrons of the RAF and their aircraft. London: Macdonald and Jane's (Publishers) ltd., 1976, (Reprinted 1978). .
 Smith, Eric. "First Things First": RAF Hornchurch and RAF Suttons Farm, 1915–1962. Romford, Essex, UK: Ian Henry Publications, 1992. .
 Smith, Richard C. Hornchurch Eagles: The Life Stories of Eight of the Airfield's Distinguished World War II Fighter Pilots. London: Grub Street Publishing, 2002. .
 Smith, Richard C. Hornchurch Offensive: The Definitive Account of the RAF Fighter Airfield, its Pilots, Groundcrew and Staff. Volume Two: 1941 to the Airfield's Final Closure. London: Grub Street Publishing, 2001. .
 Smith, Richard C. Hornchurch Scramble: The Definitive Account of the RAF Fighter Airfield, Its Pilots, Groundcrew and Staff. Volume One: 1915 to the End of the Battle of Britain. London: Grub Street Publishing, 2000. .
 Smith, Richard C. Second To None: A Pictorial History of Hornchuch Aerodrome through Two World Wars and Beyond, 1915–1962. London: Grub Street Publishing, 2004. .
Grant, Andy: romfordrecorder.co.uk: CSM Albert E Small GM

External links

 https://rafhornchurch.com/
 The RAF Hornchurch Project website
 RAF Hornchurch Conservation Area – London Borough of Havering
 Detailed historic record at PastScape
 Google Community map showing location of airfield remains
 Aerial View of the airfield in 1947
 Ordnance Survey map from 1945
 
 The R J Mitchell Primary School
 The Sanders Draper School
 RAF Hornchurch Heritage Centre

Royal Air Force stations in London
Royal Air Force stations in Essex
Royal Air Force stations of World War II in the United Kingdom
History of the London Borough of Havering
Royal Flying Corps airfields
Battle of Britain
Defence of London
Hornchurch